Velilla de los Oteros is a hamlet and minor local entity located in the municipality of Pajares de los Oteros, in León province, Castile and León, Spain. As of 2020, it has a population of 31.

Geography 
Velilla de los Oteros is located 32km south-southeast of León, Spain.

References

Populated places in the Province of León